T with the Maggies is the debut album from Irish Celtic-folk supergroup T with the Maggies. It was released on 29 October 2010 in Ireland and on 22 February 2011 in the United States.

Background

T with the Maggies, a group of individual international singers came together in 2007 to celebrate the life and music of Mícheál Ó Domhnaill, Triona and Maighread's older brother. The members, good friends for four decades, began touring together and started recording in July 2009. They began recording the album in An Bhráid, County Donegal in 2010.

Development
The band travelled to the Tyrone Guthrie Centre creative retreat in Annaghmakerrig, County Monaghan to come up with a sound different form their past projects and solo albums. There they met American artist Megan Marlatt, who would later send them a picture of similar-looking puppets that would become the album's front cover image.

On 15 June 2010, Mairéad wrote the song Domhnach na Fola, a few hours after the findings of the Saville Inquiry were read live on television around the world by British Prime Minister David Cameron. The music was co-written with fellow band-member Tríona Ní Dhomhnaill. Other songs written on the retreat were Ógánaigh Uasail and Mother's Song. They also arranged their own version of Richard Thompson's Farewell, Farewell.

Track listing

About the tracks
 "Cuach Mo Londubh Buí" – Altan previously recorded and released this track as "Cuach Mo Lon Dubh Buí" (3:02) on their (studio) album The Blue Idol (2002).
 "Ceol An Phíobaire" – Frankie Kennedy and Mairéad Ní Mhaonaigh previously recorded and released this track as "Ceol A'Phíobaire" (3:50) on their second (studio) album Altan (1987). 
 "A Stór A Stór A Ghrá" – Altan previously recorded and released this track as "Stór, A Stór, A Ghrá" (2:51) on their (studio) album Blackwater (1996).
 "An Mhaighdeán Mhara" – Altan previously recorded and released this track as "An Mhaighdean Mhara" (2:52) on their (studio) album Island Angel (1993).

Release
The album was launched in Dublin on 29 October 2010 by actor Stephen Rea. Friends of the singers in attendance included musicians Luka Bloom, Neil Martin and Paul Brady and broadcaster Miriam O'Callaghan. On 6 November 2010, T with the Maggies held a special launch in Leo's Tavern (owned by Moya's father), Gaoth Dobhair in County Donegal.

Release history

Promotion
T with the Maggies appeared on RTÉ's The Late Late Show October 29, performing the song Wedding Dress from the album. On 6 November 2010, they held a CD signing in Celtic Note, Dublin.

Personnel
The band
 T with the Maggies'' - producers, arrangers, writers
 Maighread Ní Dhomhnaill - Vocals, yardstick
 Tríona Ní Dhomhnaill - Vocals, Piano, Keyboards, Accordion, Whistle
 Mairéad Ní Mhaonaigh - Vocals, Fiddle, Hardanger Fiddle, Low Octave Fiddle, Handwritten Script (artwork)
 Moya Brennan - Vocals, Harp, Djembe

Additional credits
 Manus Lunny - Co-producer, mixer, engineering Guitar, Bouzouki, Programming
 Jim Higgins - Additional Percussion
 Tim Jarvis - Cover Design, Photography
 Megan Marlatt - Cover Concept, Photography
 Mella Travers - photography
 Richard Robinson - photography

References

External links
 Official website

2010 debut albums
T with the Maggies albums
Irish-language albums
Collaborative albums